Common Era (CE) and Before the Common Era (BCE) are year notations for the Gregorian calendar (and its predecessor, the Julian calendar), the world's most widely used calendar era. Common Era and Before the Common Era are alternatives to the original Anno Domini (AD) and Before Christ (BC) notations used for the same calendar era. The two notation systems are numerically equivalent: " CE" and "AD " each describe the current year; "400 BCE" and "400 BC" are the same year.

The term "Common Era" can be found in English as early as 1708, and became more widely used in the mid-19th century by Jewish religious scholars. Since the later 20th century, BCE and CE have become popular in academic and scientific publications because BCE and CE are religiously neutral terms.

History

Origins 

The idea of numbering years beginning from the date then believed to be the date of birth of Jesus, was conceived around the year 525 by the Christian monk Dionysius Exiguus. He did this to replace the then dominant Era of Martyrs system, because he did not wish to continue the memory of a tyrant who persecuted Christians. He numbered years from an initial reference date ("epoch"), an event he referred to as the Incarnation of Jesus. Dionysius labeled the column of the table in which he introduced the new era as "Anni Domini Nostri Jesu Christi".

This way of numbering years became more widespread in Europe with its use by Bede in England in 731. Bede also introduced the practice of dating years before what he supposed was the year of birth of Jesus, and the practice of not using a year zero. In 1422, Portugal became the last Western European country to switch to the system begun by Dionysius.

Vulgar Era 

The term "Common Era" is traced back in English to its appearance as "Vulgar Era" to distinguish dates on the Ecclesiastic calendar in popular use from dates of the regnal year, the year of the reign of a sovereign, typically used in national law. (The word 'vulgar' originally meant 'of the ordinary people', with no derogatory associations.)

The first known use of the Latin term  occurred in a 1615 book by Johannes Kepler. A 1635 English edition of that book has the title page in English – so far, the earliest-found use of Vulgar Era in English. A 1701 book edited by John LeClerc includes "Before Christ according to the Vulgar Æra, 6". A 1716 book in English by Dean Humphrey Prideaux says, "before the beginning of the vulgar æra, by which we now compute the years from his incarnation." A 1796 book uses the term "vulgar era of the nativity".

The first known use of "Christian Era" appears as the Latin phrase  on the title page of a 1584 theology book. In 1649, the Latin phrase  appeared in the title of an English almanac. A 1652 ephemeris is the first instance found so far of the English use of "Christian Era".

The English phrase "Common Era" appears at least as early as 1708, and in a 1715 book on astronomy it is used interchangeably with "Christian Era" and "Vulgar Era". A 1759 history book uses common æra in a generic sense, to refer to the common era of the Jews. The first use found so far of the phrase "before the common era" is in a 1770 work that also uses common era and vulgar era as synonyms, in a translation of a book originally written in German. The 1797 edition of the Encyclopædia Britannica uses the terms vulgar era and common era synonymously (meaning not the regnal year). In 1835, in his book Living Oracles, Alexander Campbell, wrote: "The vulgar Era, or Anno Domini; the fourth year of Jesus Christ, the first of which was but eight days", and also refers to the common era as a synonym for vulgar era with "the fact that our Lord was born on the 4th year before the vulgar era, called Anno Domini, thus making (for example) the 42d year from his birth to correspond with the 38th of the common era". The Catholic Encyclopedia (1909) in at least one article reports all three terms (Christian, Vulgar, Common Era) being commonly understood by the early 20th century.

The phrase "common era", in lower case, also appeared in the 19th century in a 'generic' sense, not necessarily to refer to the Christian Era, but to any system of dates in common use throughout a civilization. Thus, "the common era of the Jews", "the common era of the Mahometans", "common era of the world", "the common era of the foundation of Rome". When it did refer to the Christian Era, it was sometimes qualified, e.g., "common era of the Incarnation", "common era of the Nativity", or "common era of the birth of Christ".

History of the use of the CE/BCE abbreviation 
Although Jews have their own Hebrew calendar, they often use the Gregorian calendar without the AD prefix. As early as 1825, the abbreviation VE (for Vulgar Era) was in use among Jews to denote years in the Western calendar. , Common Era notation has also been in use for Hebrew lessons for more than a century. In 1856, Rabbi and historian Morris Jacob Raphall used the abbreviations CE and BCE in his book Post-Biblical History of The Jews. Jews have also used the term Current Era.

Contemporary usage 
Some academics in the fields of theology, education, archaeology and history have adopted CE and BCE notation despite some disagreement. Several style guides now prefer or mandate its use. A study conducted in 2014 found that the B.C.E./C.E. notation is not growing at the expense of B.C. and A.D. notation in the scholarly literature, and that both notations are used in a relatively stable fashion.

United Kingdom
In 2002, an advisory panel for the religious education syllabus for England and Wales recommended introducing BCE/CE dates to schools, and by 2018 some local education authorities were using them.  In 2018, the National Trust said it would continue to use BC/AD as its house style. English Heritage explains its era policy thus: "It might seem strange to use a Christian calendar system when referring to British prehistory, but the BC/AD labels are widely used and understood." Some parts of the BBC use BCE/CE, but some presenters have said they will not. As of October 2019, the BBC News style guide has entries for AD and BC, but not for CE or BCE.

The style guide for The Guardian says, under the entry for CE/BCE: "some people prefer CE (common era, current era, or Christian era) and BCE (before common era, etc) to AD and BC, which, however, remain our style".

United States
In the United States, the use of the BCE/CE notation in textbooks was reported in 2005 to be growing. Some publications have transitioned to using it exclusively. For example, the 2007 World Almanac was the first edition to switch to BCE/CE, ending a period of 138 years in which the traditional BC/AD dating notation was used. BCE/CE is used by the College Board in its history tests, and by the Norton Anthology of English Literature. Others have taken a different approach. The US-based History Channel uses BCE/CE notation in articles on non-Christian religious topics such as Jerusalem and Judaism. The 2006 style guide for the Episcopal Diocese Maryland Church News says that BCE and CE should be used.

In June 2006, in the United States, the Kentucky State School Board reversed its decision to use BCE and CE in the state's new Program of Studies, leaving education of students about these concepts a matter of local discretion.

Australia
In 2011, media reports suggested that the BC/AD notation in Australian school textbooks would be replaced by BCE/CE notation. The change drew opposition from some politicians and church leaders. Weeks after the story broke, the Australian Curriculum, Assessment and Reporting Authority denied the rumour and stated that the BC/AD notation would remain, with CE and BCE as an optional suggested learning activity.

Canada
In 2013, the Canadian Museum of Civilization (now the Canadian Museum of History) in Gatineau (opposite Ottawa), which had previously switched to BCE/CE, decided to change back to BC/AD in material intended for the public while retaining BCE/CE in academic content.

Rationales

Support 
The use of CE in Jewish scholarship was historically motivated by the desire to avoid the implicit "Our Lord" in the abbreviation AD. Although other aspects of dating systems are based in Christian origins, AD is a direct reference to Jesus as Lord.

Proponents of the Common Era notation assert that the use of BCE/CE shows sensitivity to those who use the same year numbering system as the one that originated with and is currently used by Christians, but who are not themselves Christian.

Former United Nations Secretary-General Kofi Annan has argued:

Adena K. Berkowitz, in her application to argue before the United States Supreme Court, opted to use BCE and CE because "Given the multicultural society that we live in, the traditional Jewish designationsB.C.E. and C.E. cast a wider net of inclusion".

Some academics prefer B.C.E./C.E. because the actual date of birth of Jesus is not known and almost certainly not 1 AD.

Opposition 
Christian, non-Christian, and non-religious individuals who oppose the usage of Common Era often note the fact that there is no difference in the origin of the two systems.  BCE and CE are still based on BC and AD and denote the periods before and after Jesus was born.

Some Christians are offended by the removal of the reference to Jesus in the Common Era notation. The Southern Baptist Convention supports retaining the BC/AD abbreviations.

Roman Catholic priest and writer on interfaith issues Raimon Panikkar argued that the BCE/CE usage is the less inclusive option, since they are still using the Christian calendar numbers, forcing it on other nations. In 1993, the English-language expert Kenneth G. Wilson speculated a slippery slope scenario in his style guide that "if we do end by casting aside the AD/BC convention, almost certainly some will argue that we ought to cast aside as well the conventional numbering system [that is, the method of numbering years] itself, given its Christian basis."

Conventions in style guides 
The abbreviation BCE, just as with BC, always follows the year number. Unlike AD, which still often precedes the year number, CE always follows the year number (if context requires that it be written at all). The abbreviations are sometimes written with small capital letters, or with periods (e.g., "B.C.E." or "C.E."). The US-based Society of Biblical Literature style guide for academic texts on religion prefers BCE/CE to BC/AD.

Similar conventions in other languages 
 In Germany, Jews in Berlin seem to have already been using words translating to "(before the) common era" in the 18th century, while others like Moses Mendelssohn opposed this usage as it would hinder the integration of Jews into German society. The formulation seems to have persisted among German Jews in the 19th century in forms like  (before the common chronology). In 1938 Nazi Germany the use of this convention was also prescribed by the National Socialist Teachers League. However, it was soon discovered that many German Jews had been using the convention ever since the 18th century, and Time magazine found it ironic to see "Aryans following Jewish example nearly 200 years later".
In scholarly writing,  is the equivalent of the English "BCE", "" or "Before the Common Era".
 In Welsh, OC can be expanded to equivalents of both AD and CE; for dates before the Common Era, CC (traditionally) is used exclusively, as  would abbreviate to a mild obscenity. 
 In Russian since the October Revolution (1917) , lit. before our era) and  lit. of our era) are used almost universally.  Within Christian churches , i.e. before/after the birth of Christ, equivalent to ) remains in use.
 In Polish, "p.n.e." (lit. before our era) and "n.e." (lit. of our era) are commonly used in historical and scientific literature.
In China, upon the foundation of the Republic of China, the Government in Nanking adopted the Republic of China calendar with 1912 designated as year 1, but used the Western calendar for international purposes. In 1949, the People's Republic of China adopted  ("Common Era") for both internal and external affairs in mainland China. This notation was extended to Hong Kong in 1997 and Macau in 1999 (de facto extended in 1966) through Annex III of Hong Kong Basic Law and Macau Basic Law, thus eliminating the ROC calendar in these areas.
 In Czech, the "n. l." ( which translates as of our year count) and "př. n. l." or "před n. l." ( meaning before our year count) is used, always after the year number. The direct translation of AD (abbreviated as L. P.) or BC (abbreviated as př. Kr.) is seen as archaic.
In Croatian the common form used for BC and AD are pr. Kr. (prije Krista, "before Christ") and p. Kr. (poslije Krista, after Christ). The abbreviations ''pr. n. e.'' (''prije nove ere'', ''before new era'') and ''n. e.'' (''nove ere'', ''(of the) new era'') have also recently been introduced.
 In Danish, "f.v.t." (before our time reckoning) and "e.v.t." (after our time reckoning) are used as BCE/CE are in English. Also commonly used are "f.Kr." (before Christ) and "e.Kr." (after Christ), which are both placed after the year number in contrast with BC/AD in English.
 In Macedonian, the terms "п.н.е." (пред нашата ера "before our era") and "н.е." (наша ера "our era")  are used in every aspect, likely as a remnant of socialist era ban on religions.

See also 
 Astronomical year numbering
 Before Present
 Calendar
 Calendar reform
 Holocene Era
 List of calendars

Notes

References

External links 
 
 

1615 introductions
Calendar eras
Chronology
Linguistic controversies
Secularism
17th-century neologisms